The 2010 Kerry Senior Football Championship was the 110th staging of the Kerry Senior Football Championship since its establishment by the Kerry County Board in 1889. The draw for the opening round fixtures took place on 8 May 2010. The championship ran from 11 June to 17 October 2010.

South Kerry entered the championship as the defending champions, however, they were beaten by Dr Crokes in the semi-finals.

The final was played on 17 October 2009 at FitzGerald Stadium in Killarney, between Dr. Crokes and Austin Stacks in what was their second meeting in the final overall and a first in 16 years. Dr. Crokes won the match by 1-15 to 0-11 to claim their seventh championship title overall and a first title in 10 years.

Colm Cooper was the championship's top scorer with 4-27.

Team changes

To Championship

Promoted from the Kerry Intermediate Football Championship
 Spa

From Championship

Relegated to the Kerry Intermediate Football Championship
 An Ghaeltacht

Results

Round 1

Round 2

Relegation playoffs

Round 3

 Kilcummin received a bye in this round.

Quarter-finals

Semi-finals

Final

Championship statistcs

Top scorers

Overall

In a single game

Miscellaneous
 Dr. Crokes won a first title in ten years.
 Austin Stacks qualified for the final for the first time since 2001.
 The championship is won by a club side for the first time since 2003.
 Spa make their first appearance as a single club at senior level since 1983.

References

Kerry Senior Football Championship
2010 in Gaelic football